Kolobok (Cyrillic: колобо́к) is the main character of an East Slavic national fairy tale with the same name, represented as a small yellow spherical being (bread).

The fairy tale is prevalent in Slavic regions in a number of variations. A similar fairy tale with a pancake rolling off has also been recorded in German and Nordic regions. The plot is similar to The Gingerbread Man in English tradition. The Aarne-Thompson index classifies them in a common type 2025.

Etymology 
The origin of word kolobok is not clear, and has several proposed versions:
 connected with Proto-Slavic: *klǫbъ ("Something twisted, has a round form, similar to a ball", "club");
 from Proto-Slavic: *kolo ("circle", "wheel"), that is, "that which is round and rolling";

There are also many other versions.

Fairy tale 

The Kolobok, an old Russian round palt (based on the Swedish food item of the same name), suddenly comes to life and escapes from the home of granny and grandpa. The fairy tale's plot describes Kolobok's repetitive meetings with various animals (rabbit, wolf, and bear) who intend to eat it, but Kolobok cunningly escapes. With each animal Kolobok sings a song in which he explains, "I got away from Grandmother, I got away from Grandfather, and I will certainly get away from you." The fox manages to catch and eat Kolobok through distracting him by praising his singing.

The fairy tale in Czech is named O Koblížkovi, where Koblížek is the main character. His name comes from Kobliha, which is the same doughnut as the Polish sweet pączki or Croatian, Bosnian and Serbian Krafne. In Slovak, the story is called O Pampúchovi (About Doughnut), Ako išiel Pampúch na vandrovku (How Doughnut went to wander), or the equivalent using the diminutive Pampúšik. Pampúch is the Slovak word for the same type of Slavic doughnut.

In the German regions a very similar fairy tale was recorded in 1854 by Carl and Theodor Colshorn. In the book Märchen und Sagen aus Hannover the Low German story "Dicke fette Pannekauken, blief stahn, eck will di fräten!" has an identical plot, however at the end the "Pannkauken" (pancake) will meet hungry orphan children and so it lets itself be eaten. The name of the tale was later shortened to Low German "De dicke fette Pannkoken" and Standard German "Der dicke fette Pfannkuchen", which both can be translated to "The thick fat pancake". In the books the pancake is often depicted with little feet contrary to pictures in other variants of the fairy tale. The end of the German tale differs from the Russian. Instead of being eaten by one of the animals, the pancake gives himself to two poor children who have nothing else to eat.

In Norway a similar story was recorded in the 1840s by Peter Christen Asbjørnsen and published in the fairy tale book "Norske Folkeeventyr" as the story of the "Pannekaken". In this case the mother of seven children is baking pancakes when one suddenly comes alive. The pancake rolls off ("trillet og trillet") and out of the house. After the pancake encounters several animals, a sly pig manages to win the pancake's confidence and get close enough to eat it.

Usage of the character 
In 2018, the crater on Ryugu, a near-Earth asteroid, has been given a name "Kolobok".

See also 
Bread roll, specifically Bap
The Muffin Man
The Magic Pudding
The Gingerbread Boy, English version
Roly poly (disambiguation), especially Jam Roly-Poly

References

External links 

 The Kolobok tale (English translation by Regina Stadnik)
 КОЛОБОК (Russian text from Russian Folk Text Library)
 Vom dicken fetten Pfannekuchen (German text at Zeno.org)
 Pannekaken (Nordic text at Projekt Runeberg)

Russian folklore characters
Slavic folklore characters
ATU 2000-2199